Peter Gahan (born 9 September 1956 in Lismore, New South Wales) is a baseball player from who played 45 games for the Australian team between 1979-1987.

He also played for the Queensland Rams from 1978-1982 and 1984-1987; and for the New South Wales Patriots in 1983.

Gahan was the Far North Coast Baseball Association (FNCBA) MVP a record five-times, and is the only player from the FNCBA to have their player number retired (#17).

One highlight of Gahan's career was being named in the World All Star team at the World Games in Santa Clara in 1981.

He was the winner of the Northern New South Wales Sports Star of the Year in 1982, the same year as the Southern New South Wales Sports Star of the Year was Rugby League legend, Mick Cronin.

References

1956 births
Living people
Australian baseball players
People from Lismore, New South Wales
Sportsmen from New South Wales